Cheshmeh Ali (also Romanized as Cheshmeh ‘Alī, Chashmeh ‘Alī, and Chashmeh-ye ‘Alī; also known as Cheshmeh ‘Alā) is a village in Neyzar Rural District, Salafchegan District, Qom County, Qom Province, Iran. At the 2006 census, its population was 203, in 59 families.

The Cheshmeh Ali historical spring in the city of Rey, southern Tehran, is planned to be inscribed on the national heritage list.

References 

Populated places in Qom Province